Barbecue is a 2014 French ensemble comedy film directed by Éric Lavaine.

Cast
Lambert Wilson as Antoine Chevalier 
Franck Dubosc as Baptiste
Florence Foresti as Olivia
Guillaume de Tonquédec as Yves
Lionel Abelanski as Laurent
Jérôme Commandeur as Jean-Mich'
Sophie Duez as Véronique Chevalier
Lysiane Meis as Laure
 as Nathalie
Lucas Lavaine as Guillaume
Corentin Lavaine as Hugo
Stéphane De Groodt as Alexandre
Philippe Laudenbach as Jean Chevalier
Julie Engelbrecht as The pretty blonde

Reception
Mike McCahill of The Guardian called Barbecue a "boringly white-bread with no cinematic ambition".

While attending Beijing International Film Festival, Clarence Tsui of The Hollywood Reporter had this to say about the film: "[A] half-baked comedy-drama about a group of bourgeois friends who have to confront the pitfalls of middle age".

Representing The New York Times, Nicolas Rapold called the film "[a] kind of utterly unremarkable local product", but added that "its loosely written story doubles as a smirk-inducing glimpse at what feel like very Gallic life challenges".

References

External links

2014 comedy films
2010s French-language films
French comedy films
Films directed by Éric Lavaine
StudioCanal films
Films set in Lyon
Films shot in Lyon
2010s French films